The 2004 AF2 season was the fifth season of the AF2. It was preceded by 2003 and succeeded by 2005. The league champions were the Florida Firecats, who defeated the Peoria Pirates in ArenaCup V.

League info

Standings

 Green indicates clinched playoff berth
 Purple indicates division champion
 Grey indicates best regular season record

Playoffs

ArenaCup V

ArenaCup V was the 2004 edition of the AF2's championship game, in which the National Conference Champions Florida Firecats defeated the American Conference Champions Peoria Pirates in Estero, Florida by a score of 39 to 26 .

External links
 2004 af2 season
 Arena Cup V Stats

Af2 seasons